Alexandru Veterany, better known by his stage name Tandarica (16 January 1926, Bucharest - 1 May 1995, Buenos Aires), was an actor of comedy, popular in cinema, theater and television in Argentina during the 1980s.

References

Further reading
 Contrabandista, una figura amistosa en nuestra zona, pero...,  13 de Enero de 2020, lasegundaciudad.net
 Domingo 12 de enero, 2020-01-12, Victoria Sepciu, Radio România Internaţional

1926 births
1995 deaths
Male actors from Bucharest
Argentine male film actors
Argentine male television actors
Argentine male stage actors
Romanian male film actors
20th-century Romanian male actors
20th-century Argentine male actors
Romanian emigrants to Argentina